Mary Kaestner (died after March 1944), also seen as Mary Kastner, was an opera singer, a dramatic soprano with the San Carlo Opera Company.

Early life 
Mary Kaestner was American, from Wisconsin or California, though she was sometimes described as Viennese or German.

Career 
Kaestner was singing in Vienna when World War I began, and she returned to the United States. She toured North America with the San Carlo Opera Company for three seasons, from 1914 to 1917, singing leading roles in Aïda, Cavalleria rusticana, Lohengrin, Pagliacci, Tosca, Faust, Il trovatore, and La Gioconda. "Mary Kaestner is one of those artists who has proved at eacch appearance that certainty and poise are her assets," commented a reviewer in 1917. "Besides her dramatic voice of unusual beauty, her acting is brilliant and brainy."

Personal life 
In 1917, Mary Kaestner married Italian opera conductor Carlo Peroni, and retired from her stage career, saying "one famous person in a family is enough." She survived as his widow when Peroni died in 1944.

References 

American operatic sopranos
Year of birth missing
Year of death missing